Neal Foulds (born 13 July 1963) is an English former professional snooker player and six-time tournament winner, including the 1986 International Open, the 1988 Dubai Masters and the 1992 Scottish Masters, as well as the invitational Pot Black in 1992. He was the runner up at the 1986 UK Championship, the British Open in 1987 and reached the semi finals of the Masters on three occasions, as well as the World Championship. After his retirement, Foulds became a commentator for the BBC and is currently part of the presenting team for ITV and Eurosport.

Career
The son of snooker professional Geoff Foulds, he began playing the game at the age of 11 and by the early 1980s was already one of the strongest players in his area. Following victory in the national under-19's Championship beating John Parrott in the final, Foulds then turned professional in 1983.

At the end of the season he qualified for the final stages of the World Championship at his first attempt. Even more impressively however, he then defeated twice-champion Alex Higgins 10–9 in the first round before going down 13–9 to Doug Mountjoy in the last 16, a run that saw him enter the rankings at number 30.

Foulds quickly climbed the rankings in the seasons that followed reaching no. 3 within four years. He won his first ranking tournament in 1986, the BCE International, beating Cliff Thorburn 12–9 in the final. In the same season he was runner-up to Steve Davis in the UK Championship, and he also reached the semi-finals of the 1987 World Championship, losing 16–9 to Joe Johnson.
Starting the following season in a career high position of number three, 1987/88 was not to be quite as successful, though another strong run to the quarter-finals in the 1988 World Snooker Championship  before losing to Terry Griffiths ensured that he would retain his spot at third in the rankings. Foulds also won the 1988 Dubai Masters, beating Steve Davis in the final, though this event would not hold any ranking points until the following year.

From here however he started to struggle, dropping 17 places to 20th in the rankings and finding himself having to qualify for events the following season. Still, 1989/90 was to see a revival and despite a round one exit at the World Championship to Wayne Jones, he did enough to regain a place in the top 16 before moving up to number seven at the end of 1990/1.

In 1992, Foulds was crowned the Scottish Masters champion and also won the 1992 edition of Pot Black, beating Nigel Bond, Jimmy White, and Gary Wilkinson en route to the final, where he beat James Wattana 252–176 on a points based final.

Though he was able to maintain a top 16 place until the end of the 1993/4 season, and a place on the tour until 2003, he played his final match as a Main Tour player on 13 January 2003 before retiring from competitive play aged 39.

Foulds made a brief reappearance as a player in November 2011 in the World Seniors (aged 48) before eventually losing to Dene O'Kane.

Foulds made 88 competitive century breaks in his career.

Commentary career
Since his retirement, Foulds has moved up to the commentary box for Eurosport, BBC, Sky Sports and he also co-hosts all ITV4 tournament coverage, interviewing players as well as commentating. In 2014, Foulds made a cameo as himself commentating on a fictional match at the climax of the snooker short film drama "Extended Rest".

Personal life 
Foulds is married and has a son and a daughter. He supports Queens Park Rangers.

Performance and rankings timeline

Career finals

Ranking finals: 3 (1 title)

Non-ranking finals: 12 (5 titles)

Pro-am finals: 3 (2 titles)

Team finals: 2 (2 titles)

Amateur finals: 1 (1 title)

See also

References

External links

English snooker players
Snooker writers and broadcasters
1963 births
Living people